Tichurong, also known as Tichurongke, "poike", "Tichurong Poike" is a Sino-Tibetan language spoken by the Magar people in the Tichurong valley of Karnali Province, specifically in the Dolpa district, in western Nepal. It is spoken in the villages of Gumbatara, Gufa, Rukha, Kola, Tachin, Khani, Khani Gumba, Namdel, Baijibara, Syala, Vyas, Banthada, Chilpara, Dharapani and Lawan. 
 As of 2000, the language was spoken by 2,420 individuals.

References 

Languages of Nepal
Sino-Tibetan languages